YANGAROO.(TSXV: YOO),Yangaroo is a media content technology company that offers a platform used by the advertising and music industries, award shows, and broadcasters for the management and distribution of advertising and entertainment content.

DMDS: Digital Media Distribution System
The Digital Media Distribution System (DMDS) is a patented technology platform of YANGAROO Inc.

YANGAROO, powered by DMDS, is a secure distribution tool for audio and video media via the internet. Systems like DMDS make it possible for broadcasters, TV advertisers, and post-production companies to move away from physical media like DigiBeta tapes to digital file-based workflows.  

The DMDS service supports the following :
 Broadcasting music videos 
 Distributing television advertisements
 Distributing award show content and voting
 Distributing music to television and radio platforms

YANGAROO Music provides programmers, broadcasters, journalists, and other industry professionals the ability to preview and download pre-release media from music professionals, including record labels and independents.

YANGAROO in the Securities Market

In January 2020, YANGAROO Inc. reported that the TSX Venture Exchange has approved the company's proposal for a regular course issuer offer for up to 3,000,000 shares of its common stock, which constitutes 5% or less of the company's issued and outstanding securities.

Key Partnerships
In December 2014, YANGAROO announced a partnership with IMD Fastrax, the music distribution arm of delivery company IMD. The partnership enabled North American record labels and recording artists to deliver their music videos to the UK and Ireland via the IMD Fastrax platform.

YANGAROO has also formed a partnership with Universal Music Canada.

References 

Digital media organizations
Software companies of Canada
Technology companies established in 1999
1999 establishments in Canada